Sandro Bertaggia (born 7 May 1964) is a former Swiss professional ice hockey defenceman who competed in ice hockey at the 1992 Winter Olympics as a member of the Switzerland men's national ice hockey team.

His son is the professional hockey player, Alessio Bertaggia.

References

External links

1964 births
HC Lugano players
Living people
Swiss ice hockey defencemen
Olympic ice hockey players of Switzerland
Ice hockey players at the 1992 Winter Olympics
People from Zug
Sportspeople from the canton of Zug